The Lost Child may refer to:
 The Lost Child (1904 film), an American film directed by Wallace McCutcheon, Sr.
 The Lost Child (1947 film), a Mexican comedy film
 The Lost Child, a 2000 film directed by Karen Arthur
 The Lost Child (video game), a 2017 role-playing video game